The Sporting News Men's College Basketball Player of the Year is an annual basketball award given to the best men's basketball player in NCAA Division I competition. The award was first given following the 1942–43 season and is presented by Sporting News (formerly The Sporting News), an American–based sports magazine that was established in 1886.

No award winners were selected from 1947 to 1949 and from 1952 to 1957. Repeat winners of the Sporting News Player of the Year award are rare; as of 2023, it has occurred only seven times. Of those seven repeat winners, only Oscar Robertson of Cincinnati and Bill Walton of UCLA have been named the player of the year three times.

UCLA and Duke have the most all-time with seven. North Carolina has the second most with five winners.

Key

Winners

Winners by school

Footnotes

See also
List of U.S. men's college basketball national player of the year awards

References

Specific

Awards established in 1943
College basketball trophies and awards in the United States